Franz Meister is an Austrian para-alpine skier. He won one gold, one silver and two bronze medals at the 1976 and 1980 Winter Paralympics.

Career 

Meister competed in three events at the 1976 Winter Paralympics and two events at the 1980 Winter Paralympics.

Achievements

See also 

 List of Paralympic medalists in alpine skiing

References 

Living people
Year of birth missing (living people)
Paralympic alpine skiers of Austria
Alpine skiers at the 1976 Winter Paralympics
Alpine skiers at the 1980 Winter Paralympics
Medalists at the 1976 Winter Paralympics
Medalists at the 1980 Winter Paralympics
Paralympic bronze medalists for Austria
Paralympic silver medalists for Austria
Paralympic gold medalists for Austria
Place of birth missing (living people)
Paralympic medalists in alpine skiing
20th-century Austrian people